Boldondeb Woods is a woodland local nature reserve in Conwy, Wales. Located on the western shore of the Conwy estuary, the woodland is a mix of coniferous and deciduous trees.

References

Conwy
Nature reserves in Conwy County Borough